USNS Charlton (T-AKR-314) is one of Military Sealift Command's nineteen Large, Medium-Speed Roll-on/Roll-off Ships and is part of the 33 ships in the Prepositioning Program. She is a Watson-class vehicle cargo ship named for Sergeant Cornelius H. Charlton, a Medal of Honor recipient.

History
 
Laid down on 4 January 1999 and launched on 11 December 1999, Charlton was put into service in the Pacific Ocean on 23 May 2000.

References

 

Watson-class vehicle cargo ships
Ships built in San Diego
1999 ships